The Transportation Act, 1920, commonly known as the Esch–Cummins Act,  was a United States federal law that returned railroads to private operation after World War I, with much regulation. It also officially encouraged private consolidation of railroads and mandated that the Interstate Commerce Commission (ICC) ensure their profitability. The act was named after Rep. John J. Esch and Sen. Albert B. Cummins.

Background
The United States had entered World War I in April 1917, and the government found that the nation's railroads were not prepared to serve the war effort. On December 26, 1917, President Woodrow Wilson had ordered that U.S. railroads be nationalized in the public interest. This order was implemented through the creation of the United States Railroad Administration. Congress ratified the order in the Railway Administration Act of 1918.

Major provisions
 Terminated federal control of railroads from March 1, 1920.
 Authorized the government to make settlements with railroad carriers for matters caused by nationalization, such as compensation and other expenses.
 Directed the ICC to prepare and adopt a plan for the consolidation of the railway properties of the United States into a limited number of systems. See Ripley Plan to consolidate railroads into regional systems.
 Granted authority to the ICC to set minimum shipping rates, oversee railroads' financial operations, and regulate acquisitions and mergers.
 Established procedures for settling labor disputes between railroads and employees. A Railroad Labor Board was created to regulate wages and settle disputes.

Subsequent legislation
Title III of the Esch–Cummins Act, which pertained to labor disputes, was repealed in 1926 by the Railway Labor Act.

See also
 Interstate Commerce Act of 1887
 Elkins Act of 1903
 Mann-Elkins Act of 1910
 Railway Labor Act of 1926
 History of rail transport in the United States

Footnotes

Further reading

 E.G. Buckland, "Three Years of the Transportation Act," Yale Law Journal, vol. 32, no. 7 (May 1923), pp. 658–675. In JSTOR.
 A.B. Cummins, The Transportation Act, 1920. n.c.: n.p., October 1922.
 Colin J. Davis, Power at Odds: The 1922 National Railroad Shopmen's Strike. Urbana: University of Illinois Press, 1997.
 W.N. Doak, "Labor Policies of the Transportation Act from the Point of View of Railroad Employees," Proceedings of the Academy of Political Science in the City of New York, vol. 10, no. 1 (July 1922), pp. 39–48. In JSTOR.
 Frank H. Dixon, "Functions and Policies of the Railroad Labor Board," Proceedings of the Academy of Political Science in the City of New York, vol. 10, no. 1 (July 1922), pp. 19–28. In JSTOR.
 Ben W. Hooper, "Labor, Railroads and the Public," American Bar Association Journal, vol. 9, no. 1 (Jan. 1923), pp. 15–18. In JSTOR.
 Rogers MacVeagh, The Transportation Act, 1920: Its Sources, History, and Text, Together with Its Amendments to the Interstate Commerce Act... New York: Henry Holt and Co., 1923.
 Edgar J. Rich, "The Transportation Act of 1920," American Economic Review, vol. 10, no. 3 (Sept. 1920), pp. 507–527. In JSTOR.
 Henry R. Seager, "Railroad Labor and the Labor Problem," Proceedings of the Academy of Political Science in the City of New York, vol. 10, no. 1 (July 1922), pp. 15–18. In JSTOR.
 T. W. van Metre, "Railroad Regulation under the Transportation Act," Proceedings of the Academy of Political Science in the City of New York, vol. 10, no. 1 (July 1922), pp. 3–12. In JSTOR.
 Harry D. Wolf, The Railroad Labor Board. Chicago: University of Chicago Press, 1927.
 H.D. Wolf, "Criticisms of the Railroad Labor Board and an Evaluation of Its Work," University Journal of Business, vol. 5, no. 1 (Jan. 1927), pp. 1–34. In JSTOR.

United States railroad regulation
1920 in American law
United States federal transportation legislation
1920 in rail transport
66th United States Congress